Spiny  may refer to:
 Spiny, Poland, a village in the district of Gmina Pakosławice, within Nysa County, Opole Voivodeship, in south-western Poland
 Spiny, a fictional four-legged creature in the Mario franchise, often thrown by Lakitus

See also
 Spinosa (disambiguation), a Latin word meaning spiny